Panagiotis Patakas (born 1926) was a Greek professional footballer who played as a forward.

Club career
Patakas started football in 1944 at Megas Alexandros Thessaloniki and in 1948 he was transferred to AEK Athens. With his two goals in the replay match of the final, AEK won the Greek Cup against Panathinaikos, on 3 July 1949. During his spell at AEK he won 2 consecutive Cups and a Athens FCA Championship. He briefly returned to Megas Alexandros in 1951 for a year and again to AEK, where he ended his career in 1955.

International career
Patakas was part of Greece Olympic squad for the 1952 Summer Olympics, but he did not play in any matches. He played once on 25 July 1952 in a 4–2 win over the Great Britain Olympic Team in a friendly match at Hämeenlinna as both teams had recently been eliminated during the preliminary round of the Summer Olympics. He is the only footballer of Megas Alexandros to be named international at men's level.

Honours

AEK Athens
Greek Cup: 1948–49, 1949–50
Athens FCA Championship: 1950

References

External links

1926 births
Possibly living people
Greek footballers
Greece international footballers
Footballers from Thessaloniki
Association football forwards
AEK Athens F.C. players